The Otis Elevator Company Building is a commercial building located in northwest Portland, Oregon listed on the National Register of Historic Places.

The single-story building became the Otis Elevator Company's Portland headquarters in 1920, and was used for offices, servicing and parts storage.  It remained in use by the Otis company until 1975.

See also
 National Register of Historic Places listings in Northwest Portland, Oregon

References

External links
 

1920 establishments in Oregon
Commercial buildings completed in 1920
National Register of Historic Places in Portland, Oregon
Otis Worldwide
Pearl District, Portland, Oregon